Sergey Aleksandrovich Kundik (born 10 July 1995) is a Russian-Portuguese football striker who plays as a striker for Laval United.

Early life
Sergey was born in Novosibirsk, Russia and moved to Portugal with his family when he was only nine years of age. He is a national of both Russia and Portugal.

Club career
Starting his youth career in Portugal, Kundik travelled from one club to another in the next five years before joining the Spartak Moscow youth system in his home country in 2011, having had a number of trials during that period, including those at Real Madrid and Palmeiras. Shortly after the Russian club refused to sign him, he was offered a contract with Rangers for the 2012–2013 season where he played for the reserves. He finally signed a senior contract with the third-tier club Nogueirense in Portugal. On 30 January 2017, he agreed to join Cypriot First Division side Anagennisi Deryneia for the rest of the season. He played a total of five games in the 2016–17 season (which Anagennisi ended at the bottom of the table, resulting in relegation), including one in the cup against Doxa Katokopias.

References

1995 births
Living people
Sportspeople from Novosibirsk
Portuguese footballers
A.D. Nogueirense players
Anagennisi Deryneia FC players
AEZ Zakakiou players
Panegialios F.C. players
A.P.S. Zakynthos players
FK Banga Gargždai players
Portuguese expatriate footballers
Expatriate footballers in Cyprus
Portuguese expatriate sportspeople in Cyprus
Expatriate footballers in Greece
Portuguese expatriate sportspeople in Greece
Expatriate footballers in Lithuania
Portuguese expatriate sportspeople in Lithuania
Cypriot First Division players
Cypriot Second Division players
Association football forwards
Portuguese people of Russian descent